Benjamin Darvill (born January 4, 1967), known by his stage name Son of Dave, is a Canadian musician and singer–songwriter, based in the United Kingdom. He was a member of Grammy award-nominated, Juno award-winning folk rock band Crash Test Dummies in which he played harmonica, mandolin, guitar and percussion before returning to his blues, Beat-Box and harmonica driven solo work in 2000.

SOD was born in Winnipeg, Manitoba. He was inspired to learn the harmonica after hearing James Cotton and Sonny Terry play at the Winnipeg Folk Festival.

He moved to London, England, in 1998 and has remained there until 2021, he has since moved back to Winnipeg, Canada. (Source: I'm a friend of Son Of Dave)  Son of Dave has recorded six albums to date and performed over eight hundred shows across Europe, as well as performing in Canada, the United States, Australia, South Africa, Uganda, Japan, Russia, and Cuba.

Son of Dave appeared on BBC television's Later...with Jools Holland in 2005, performing the song "Hellhound", before recording the song a few years later on the album 03.

His 2003 album 02 has been described as a mix of "cotton-pickin’ blues, vocalising beat-box, hard-breathing folk, steamy funk and even modern R&B".

A song from 02, "Devil Take My Soul", which features chorus vocal by Martina Topley-Bird, was featured in the Warner Bros film, License to Wed, starring Robin Williams.

In 2010, the track "Shake A Bone" from the album of the same title, recorded by Steve Albini, was featured on season 3 episode 11 of Breaking Bad.

In 2010, Son of Dave and his song "Revolution Town" were featured in a commercial for the search engine Bing. The commercial, using a first-person perspective, shows Son of Dave using Bing and his Windows-enabled phone to travel to his own concert at the Someday Lounge in Portland, OR.

In 2016, the track "Voodoo Doll" from the album Shake A Bone was featured as the last song in the first episode of Preacher, an AMC series based on the comic book of the same title.

Discography

Son of Dave
 B. Darvill's Wild West Show (1999)  Kartel 019
 01 (2000)  Kartel 002
 02 (2006)  Kartel 003
 03 (2008)  Kartel 013
 Shake a Bone (2010)  Kartel 023
 Blues at the Grand (2013)  Kartel SOD001
 Explosive Hits  (2016) Goddamn Records SOD002 
 Music For Cop Shows (2017) Goddamn Records SOD003
 Call Me A Cab (2021) Goddamn Records SOD004
 Call Me King (2022) Goddamn Records SOD005

Crash Test Dummies

 The Ghosts That Haunt Me (1991)
 God Shuffled His Feet (1993)
 A Worm's Life (1996)
 Give Yourself a Hand (1999)

References

External links
 Review of 'Ain't Going to Niketown' on the Daily Music Guide
 2006 interview with Darvill at BluesinLondon.com
 Son of Dave Official Website
 Son of Dave's artist page at SEYDEL

1967 births
Living people
Musicians from Winnipeg
Canadian rock guitarists
Canadian male guitarists
Crash Test Dummies members